No Strings Attached is the third studio album by American accordion band Those Darn Accordions, released on June 18, 1996 by Globe Records.

Overview
Released at the height of TDA's popularity, No Strings Attached showcases the band's trademark mixture of accordion-driven rock, pop and polka, as well as boasting ska, funk and jazz influences. The album notably features two cover songs, one of The Whos "Baba O'Riley" and the other of Rod Stewarts "Da Ya Think I'm Sexy?", the latter sung by TDA's then-81-year-old member Clyde Forsman.

In a positive review, the Memphis Flyer called TDA "the true champions" of the alternative music scene's revival of the accordion, ahead of Brave Combo and They Might Be Giants. The review concluded "This is one recording filled with good-natured humor where the novelty doesn't wear off, because there's a wealth of musical integrity behind it. Those Darn Accordions! are blazing a trail down a path that most fear to tread, and they're doing it with panache and aplomb".

Track listing

Personnel
Those Darn Accordions
Linda "Big Lou" Seekins - accordion, lead vocals (5, 13), background vocals
Patty Brady - accordion, lead vocals (13), background vocals
Clyde Forsman - accordion, lead vocals (13, 14), background vocals
Suzanne Garramone - accordion, lead vocals (13), background vocals
Art Peterson - accordion, lead vocals (5, 13), background vocals
Paul Rogers - accordion, lead vocals (1, 2, 3, 6, 7, 9, 10, 11, 13)
Bill Schwartz - drums, percussion, background vocals
Lewis Wallace - bass guitar

Additional musicians
Dick Contino - solo accordion on tracks 5 & 12
"Weird Al" Yankovic - vocals on track 13
John Moore - tuba
Danute Janutiene - vocals on track 4

References

1996 albums
Those Darn Accordions albums